Dergach may refer to:

Mount Dergach in Antarctica
Vladimir Dergach (born 1957), Russian football player and coach
Bora-class guided missile hovercraft, named Dergach by NATO

See also
 
 Derkach